Chung Hom Kok Beach is a gazetted beach next to Chung Hom Wan located on the western shore of Chung Hom Kok, Southern District, Hong Kong. The beach has barbecue pits and is managed by the Leisure and Cultural Services Department of the Hong Kong Government. The beach is rated as Grade 1 by the Environmental Protection Department for its water quality.

The beach is about 169 metres long and it offers views of Round Island.

History
On 29 March 2021, a red tide was spotted by Environmental Protection Department staff at the beach.

Usage
The beach is a smaller beach compared to other beaches and is one of the popular beaches in Southern District.

Features
The beach has the following features:
 BBQ pits (24 nos.)
 Changing rooms
 Showers
 Toilets
 Light refreshment kiosk
 Water sports centre
 Playground

See also
 Beaches of Hong Kong

References

External links 

 Official website

Chung Hom Kok
Beaches of Hong Kong